Andrea Bianchi (31 March 1925 – 14 November 2013) was an Italian film director and writer.

Filmography

 Diabólica malicia (1972) (as Andrew White) (uncredited in English version)
 Treasure Island (1972) (as Andrew White) (uncredited in English version)
 Cry of a Prostitute (1974)
 Basta con la guerra... facciamo l'amore (1974)
 Nude per l'assassino (1975) a/k/a Strip Nude for Your Killer
 La Moglie di mio padre (1976)
 Cara dolce nipote (1977)
 La Moglie siciliana (1978)
 Malabimba – The Malicious Whore (1979) (as Andrew White)
 The Erotic Dreams of a Lady (1980)
 Le notti del terrore / Nights of Terror (1981) a/k/a Burial Ground
 Piège pour une femme seule (1982)
 Altri desideri particolari (1983)
 Giochi carnali (1983)
 Morbosamente vostra (1985) (as Andrew White)
 Dolce pelle di Angela (1986)
 Maniac Killer (1987)
 Incontri in case private (1988) (as Andrew White)
 Racconti di donne (1988) (as Andrew White)
 Commando Mengele (1988) (as A. Frank Drew White)
 Massacre (1989)
 Io Gilda (1989)
 Qualcosa in più (1990) (as Andrew White)
 Gioco di seduzione (1990)
 Bambola di carne (1991) (as Andrew White)
 Formula 3 – I ragazzi dell'autodromo (1993)
 3 Ninjas: Knuckle Up (1993)

References

External links

1925 births
2013 deaths
Film directors from Rome
Horror film directors
Giallo film directors
Italian pornographic film directors